Ehingen (Donau) (Swabian: Eegne) is a town in the Alb-Donau district in Baden-Württemberg, Germany, situated on the left bank of the Danube, approx.  southwest of Ulm and  southeast of Stuttgart.

The city, like the entire district of Ehingen, belonged to the French occupation zone from 1945 and initially came to the post-war state of Württemberg-Hohenzollern and from 1952 to the administrative region of South Württemberg-Hohenzollern in the new state of Baden-Württemberg.

Statistics

Ehingen is situated at 48°17'N and 9°43'E at 515 meters above sea level (town hall).

In contrast to many other towns in Germany, Ehingen's number of inhabitants has constantly been growing during the last years. In 2006 it peaked at 26,054. However, according to forecasts, no major changes are expected anymore until 2025. This development against the trend probably has its roots in a favorable economic situation.

While many other cities and towns struggle with the problem of a quickly ageing society, Ehingen has managed to keep the average age of its inhabitants below the Baden-Württemberg average, which is the lowest among all German Länder. In 2006 the average was 39.9 years of age, until 2025 it will rise to 45.3 according to forecasts, which still will be lower than the average age in Baden-Württemberg.

Geographical location
Ehingen is located on the southern edge of the middle Swabian Jura on the north bank of the Danube.
The Danube clips the city only in the extreme southeast.
The district Rißtissen is as exclave around eight kilometers east of the center in the Danube plain on the crack.

Neighboring communities
The following cities and towns (they belong, unless otherwise indicated, to the Alb-Donau-Kreis) adjoin the town of Ehingen, in clockwise called, starting from the north:
Schelklingen, Allmendingen, Altheim (Ehingen), Öpfingen and Griesingen, Laupheim and Schemmerhofen (both Biberach district) Unterstadion, Rottenacker, Munderkingen, Untermarchtal and Lauterach and Hayingen and Münsingen (both Reutlingen (district)).

Constituent

The town consists of the core city, which includes municipalities Dettingen and Berkach (incorporated in 1939), and the municipalities Altbierlingen, Altsteußlingen, Berg, Dächingen, Erbstetten, Frankenhofen, Gamerschwang, Granheim, Herbertshofen, Heufelden, Kirchbierlingen, Kirchen, Mundingen, Nasgenstadt, Rißtissen, Schaiblishausen and Volkersheim (incorporated in the framework of local government reform in the 1970s). The former municipalities are also places in the sense of Baden-Württemberg municipal code, that is, they each have one of the voters at each municipal election to be elected Ortschaftsrat with a mayor as chairman. In every town there is a village administrative, quasi a "local city", whose leader is the mayor.
Some districts still include spatially separate living spaces with their own name, but usually have few inhabitants, or residential areas with their own brand name names have emerged in the course of development and whose boundaries are then usually not well-defined. Such dwelling places are:
in the core city: Jägerhof, Käshof, Saurücken, Steinhoflehen and Ziegelhof
in Berg: Ernsthof
in Erbstetten: Vogelhof
in Frankenhofen: Karlshof.

History 

"Eh'gna", the dialect pronunciation of the name Ehingen, has first been mentioned in a written document in 961. The settlement prospered in the 12th and 13th centuries under the reign of the counts of Berg-Schelklingen, Berg nowadays being just the name of a village south of Ehingen. In 1343, the count, Conrad, sold his lands to the Austrian branch of the Habsburgs, who enfeoffed them back to Conrad. Conrad died, without heirs, in 1346; Ehingen therefore became part of Further Austria, eventually being administered as part of the Günzburg district, along with Habsburg parts of the former Burgau. In 1805, the treaties of Pressburg put Ehingen under the rule of the new kingdom of Württemberg. In 1688 and 1749 large parts of the town were destroyed by fire.

Religion

The territory of the city of Ehingen first belonged to the diocese of Konstanz. As a result of it belonging to Austria, the Reformation was not introduced, so that the city remained predominantly Catholic for many centuries. Only in the district Mundingen, the Reformation was introduced in 1535, because it belonged to Württemberg. The first Ehingen church was mentioned in 1182; in 1339, it appeared as a church consecrated to St. Blasius.

Today's St. Blasius church is a building from the 18th century with a tower from 1888. Another Catholic church is the Herz-Jesu-Kirche (Konviktskirche) from 1712/19 with a tower from 1885. The Catholics of the core city and Altsteußlingen, Berkach, Dettingen and Herbertshofen belong to the two parishes of St. Blasius and St. Michael. Altsteußlingen has a church from 1756 with a Gothic choir and a new tower from 1970. In the accompanying Weiler Blienshofen, there is the Chapel of St. Georg from 1485, which was renewed in the 18th century.

In the other districts of Ehingen, there are the following Catholic parishes: Dächingen, Erbstetten, Frankenhofen, Gamerschwang, Granheim, Kirchbierlingen, Nasgenstadt.

All these Catholic parishes belonged to the early 19th century to the diocese of Konstanz and then the country Chapter Ehingen. Since 1821 they belong to the diocese of Rottenburg, now the Roman Catholic Diocese of Rottenburg-Stuttgart. The former deanery Ehingen was consolidated in 2008 with the deanery Ulm to new deanery Ehingen-Ulm based in Ulm.

In the 19th century and again members of the Evangelical Church moved to Ehingen, later also in the other today Catholic neighborhoods Ehingen. At first they were supervised by the parish Rottenacker. 1848 branch church was in Ehingen decorated and built in 1879 a Protestant church. Since 1889, there is a separate parish. The community center Wenzelstein own parish was created in 1971. Today, the two parishes Ehingen-Nord and Ehingen-Süd form the Protestant parish Ehingen, together with Allmendingen the total parish Ehingen within the church district Blaubeuren of in Württemberg Protestant Church forms.

Mundingen district has its own Protestant church community that has existed since the Reformation, because this place then already belonged to Württemberg. The local parish church was rebuilt in 1790.

Transportation
Train transportation is served by the Ulm–Sigmaringen railway.

Twin towns – sister cities

Ehingen is twinned with:
 Esztergom, Hungary

Notable people
Jacob Bidermann (1578–1639), Baroque playwright
Anno of Cologne (1010–1075), Bishop of Cologne and regent of the Holy Roman Empire
Michael Glöckner (born 1969), cyclist
Karl Rapp (1882–1962), founder and owner of the Munich Rapp Motorenwerke
Anton Schlecker (born 1944), entrepreneur, founder of Schlecker drug stores
Zoltan Sebescen (born 1975), footballer
Jonas Ried (born 2004), racing driver

References

Alb-Donau-Kreis
Württemberg